The Liard Highway (designated Highway 77 in British Columbia and Highway 7 in the Northwest Territories) is a 378 km two-lane highway in Canada that is the only direct road link between British Columbia and the Northwest Territories. Passing through sparsely-populated areas of boreal forest, it serves as the sole land access route for the communities of Fort Liard and Nahanni Butte.

Route
It terminates at a junction with Territorial Highway 1 south of Fort Simpson.

History

The highway was built between 1975 and 1982 and was officially opened to traffic in June 1984. The section in British Columbia was built under contracts with the Ministry of Transportation and Highways at a cost of $26 million (equivalent to $ million in 2021). The section through the Northwest Territories section was built by the federal government at a cost of $55 million (equivalent to $ million in 2021). British Columbia assigned the number 77 to its portion of the route in 1984.

In 2012, Peter's Bros. The project was completed in August 2012.

As of 2018, Highway 77 has been fully paved up to the border with the Northwest Territories.

Major intersections
From south to north:

References

External links
Google Maps: Highway 77 route in British Columbia
Google Maps: Highway 7 route in the Northwest Territories

British Columbia provincial highways
Northwest Territories territorial highways